Beach Head 2000 is a first-person shooter game developed by Digital Fusion. It was originally released by WizardWorks for Microsoft Windows and MacSoft for Mac OS as a "value-priced" release. A loose remake of the 1983 computer game Beach Head, it shared a similar premise, as players defend a beach against attack by utilizing a variety of weapons. A version of the game was also produced for video arcades by Tsunami Visual Technologies, available in various motion simulation cabinets and Digital Fusion continues to sell the Windows version as a download via its website.

Gameplay 

Players take the role of the sole gunner defending a beach against invading enemy soldiers, tanks, helicopters and other military attack vehicles. The player utilizes a variety of weapons, including a gun turret with a machine gun, howitzer cannon and guided surface-to-air missiles. A handgun is available as a final means of defense. The mouse is used to aim. Additional ammo and health are available by shooting packages dropped with parachutes. Missions end when all enemies are defeated, each mission changes the spawn point of enemies on the beach. There are infinite missions and the game has no ending.

Reception 

The game was met with mostly negative reviews, with much of the criticism centered around its gameplay. GameSpot said "The game grows old quickly, as taking out the stream of enemies in each level becomes repetitive." A review in Allgame said that "the initial appeal of Beach Head 2000's single view wears off very quickly" and compared it unfavorably to the original Beach Head. Inside Mac Games commented that the game was not worth the relatively low price, even among a limited selection of Mac OS games. However, IGN had a more positive reaction to the game, comparing it to Missile Command and calling it "strangely addicting."

Sequels 
Digital Fusion produced several sequels, Beach Head 2002, Beach Head Desert War and Baghdad Central Desert Gunner. Global VR would take over the license from Tsunami and produce arcade versions of the first three games in the series.

References

External links 

2000 video games
Arcade video games
First-person shooters
Classic Mac OS games
Windows games
Shoot 'em ups
Infogrames games
Video games developed in the United States
War video games
MacSoft games
Single-player video games
Video game remakes
WizardWorks games